Super Chinese Fighter EX is a fighting video game for the Game Boy Color released by Culture Brain in 1999. It is part of the Super Chinese series and is the final Fighter game in the series.

Unlike most of the Super Chinese games, Fighter EX is not an action game or role-playing video game. The game features several characters from the Super Chinese series, including the main characters, Jack and Ryu.

External links
Super Chinese Fighter EX at GameFAQs

Game Boy Color games
Game Boy Color-only games
1999 video games
Japan-exclusive video games
Super Chinese Fighter
Video games developed in Japan
Multiplayer and single-player video games